Athens Township is a township in Gentry County, in the U.S. state of Missouri.

Athens Township was named after the original name of what now is Albany, Missouri.

References

Townships in Missouri
Townships in Gentry County, Missouri